Cionodon (meaning 'column tooth') is a dubious genus of hadrosaurid dinosaur from the Late Cretaceous. The type species, C. arctatus, was found in the Denver Formation of Lodge Pole Creek, Colorado and was formally described by Edward Drinker Cope in 1874 based on the holotype AMNH 3951, collected in 1873. It is a nomen dubium because it is based on very fragmentary remains. Two other species have since been described: Cionodon kysylkumensis (Riabinin, 1931), based on the holotype CCMGE 1/3760 (a set of vertebrae) from Uzbekistan, and Cionodon stenopsis (Cope, 1875), discovered in rocks from the Judith River Formation of Alberta, Canada in 1874. Although both are probably hadrosaurs, they are known only from fragmentary remains and Cionodon kysylkumensis has since been reclassified as Bactrosaurus kysylkumensis.

See also
 Timeline of hadrosaur research

References

Late Cretaceous dinosaurs of North America
Hadrosaurs
Nomina dubia
Fossil taxa described in 1874
Taxa named by Edward Drinker Cope
Paleontology in Colorado
Maastrichtian genus first appearances
Maastrichtian genus extinctions
Ornithischian genera